Tarutao National Park consists of 51 islands in the Strait of Malacca, off the coast of Satun Province of southern Thailand.  The Tarutao National Park consists of two island groups: Tarutao (or ) and Adang-Rawi, which are scattered from 20 to 70 kilometres' distance from the south-westernmost point of mainland Thailand. The park covers an area of 931,250 rai ~  of which  ocean and  island. The southernmost end of the park lies on the border with Malaysia, just north of Langkawi. Tarutao became Thailand's second marine national park on 19 April 1974. The coastal Khao Sam Roi Yot National Park had been designated in 1966.

The name "tarutao" is a Thai corruption of its original Malay name, "pulau tertua", "old, mysterious, and primitive island."

Ko Tarutao was the setting for Survivor: Thailand, the 2002 season for the U.S. reality television series, Survivor.

Main (larger) islands
There are essentially nine islands of note in the Tarutao/Adang-Rawi archipelagos:

 Tarutao Archipelago (approximately 30 km off the Thai coast)

Ko Tarutao – The largest of the islands, Ko Tarutao is 26.5 km long, and 11 km wide. The highest point is over 700 m. Forest covers over 70% of the island.

 Klang Archipelago (approximately 38 km off the Thai coast)
Ko Klang, Ko Khai, Ko Ta-Nga

 The Adang/Rawi group of islands (approximately 50 km west of Tarutao)
 Ko Adang, Ko Rawi, Ko Lipe, Ko Butang (also written as Tong or Dong), Ko Lek
 In the Adang Archipelago, the small (4 km2) island of Lipe is the most important.  With water available year-round, it is the home of the largest permanent settlement, of approximately 800, and the gateway for boat transportation in and out of the Adang group.

History
The park was established in 1974. In 1982, it was listed as one of the original ASEAN Heritage Parks. It was also submitted to UNESCO for inclusion as a World Heritage Site in 1990, but its listing was deferred at the fifteenth session of the World Heritage Committee in 1991. UNESCO requested stronger management of the area. The rivers and swamps of Tarutao Island were the last known refuge for the saltwater crocodile, Crocodylus porosus, within Thailand. The species is now extinct in the area.

The oldest surviving eyewitness description of the island dates from December 1606 and January 1607 and is contained in the travelogue of the Dutch East India Company Admiral Cornelis Matelief de Jonge. In the late-1930s the island was used as a penal colony for Thai political prisoners. During World War II, when support from the mainland was cut off, the guards and prisoners banded together and raided ships sailing through the waters near the island. The raids were masterminded by an American plantation owner who blamed the war for the loss of his fortune. He was assisted by two British non-commissioned officers who were on the run for murder and who ironically landed on Tarutao to sit out the war. They sank 130 ships, always killing everyone on board. After the pirates of Tarutao were eradicated by British forces at the end of the war, fishermen and farmers took up residence on the island.

Attractions 
Son Bay (Ao Son) is the only bay on the west side of Tarutao National Park and is known as a place where turtles come to lay their eggs. Its longest beach is about 3 km.
Luu Doo Waterfall on Son Bay is the only waterfall in Tarutao National Park. Underwater it is full of rock formations.
Pantaemaraka Gulf has many pine trees and a clean white beach. Pantaemaraka Gulf is becoming a popular tourist attraction.
Crocodile Cave is 300 metres deep. Tourists going to Crocodile Cave must go by long-tail boat (15 minutes) from Pantaemaraka Gulf and on the way to Crocodile Cave they can see mangrove forest.

Ecosystem 
In November 2018, the Department of Natural Park, Wildlife and Plant Conservation banned the use of plastic and Styrofoam containers in Tarutao Islands National Park, according to Assistant Park Director Kittipong Sanui.

Additional images

See also
List of national parks of Thailand
List of Protected Areas Regional Offices of Thailand

References

External links

Geography of Satun province
National parks of Thailand
ASEAN heritage parks
Islands of Thailand
Strait of Malacca
Protected areas established in 1974
Tourist attractions in Satun province
1974 establishments in Thailand